7784 Watterson, provisional designation , is a stony Phocaea asteroid from the inner regions of the asteroid belt, approximately 6 kilometers in diameter. It was discovered by American astronomer Timothy Spahr at the U.S. Catalina Station, Arizona, on 5 August 1994. The asteroid was named after cartoonist Bill Watterson.

Orbit and classification 

The S-type asteroid is a member of the Phocaea family, a group of asteroids with similar orbital characteristics. It orbits the Sun in the inner main-belt at a distance of 1.7–2.8 AU once every 3 years and 5 months (1,248 days). Its orbit has an eccentricity of 0.24 and an inclination of 23° with respect to the ecliptic.

Physical characteristics 

In 2011, a photometric lightcurve analysis by astronomer Brian Skiff gave a rotation period of  hours with a relatively low brightness amplitude of 0.10 magnitude, indicative of a nearly spheroidal shape.

According to the surveys carried out by the NEOWISE mission of NASA's Wide-field Infrared Survey Explorer (WISE), Watterson has an albedo of 0.19 and a diameter of 5.6 kilometers. The Collaborative Asteroid Lightcurve Link agrees with WISE's observations and assumes a slightly higher albedo of 0.23 and calculates a diameter of 5.5 kilometers.

Naming 

This minor planet is named after Bill Watterson (born 1958), cartoonist of the daily comic strip Calvin and Hobbes. Syndicated from 1985 to 1995, this strip is fondly remembered and treasured by the discoverer, and helped him stay awake and sane on long observing nights and during the trials and tribulations of graduate school.

Notes

References

External links 
 Asteroid Lightcurve Database (LCDB), query form (info )
 Dictionary of Minor Planet Names, Google books
 Asteroids and comets rotation curves, CdR – Observatoire de Genève, Raoul Behrend
 Discovery Circumstances: Numbered Minor Planets (5001)-(10000) – Minor Planet Center
 
 

007784
Discoveries by Timothy B. Spahr
Named minor planets
19940805